Belden L. Hill  (August 24, 1864 - October 22, 1934) was a third baseman in Major League Baseball who played for the Baltimore Orioles of the American Association in nine games in 1890. He remained active as a player in minor league baseball through 1905.

Hill helped found the Cedar Rapids Bunnies minor league team  and managed the club from 1896–1908 and 1913-1914. He won league championships with Cedar Rapids in 1897 and 1906 and served as President of the Mississippi Valley League from 1926-1931.

External links
 Baseball Reference

19th-century baseball players
Baltimore Orioles (AA) players
Major League Baseball third basemen
Baseball players from Illinois
1864 births
1934 deaths
Minor league baseball managers
LaCrosse Freezers players
Akron Acorns players
Crawfordsville Hoosiers players
Terre Haute Hoosiers players
Fort Worth Panthers players
Baltimore Orioles (IL) players
Newark Little Giants players
Washington Senators (minor league) players
Lebanon Cedars players
Davenport Pilgrims players
Chattanooga Chatts players
Chattanooga Warriors players
Rock Island-Moline Islanders players
Lincoln Treeplanters players
Cedar Rapids Bunnies players
Cedar Rapids Rabbits players
Des Moines Hawkeyes players